MOSC domain-containing protein 2, mitochondrial is a protein that in humans is encoded by the MOSC2 gene.

References

Further reading